The 2016–17 Jordan FA Cup was the 37th season of the national football competition of Jordan. The winners of the competition will earn a spot in the 2018 AFC Cup.

The 12 teams from the Jordan Premier League started in a group stage at round one. Six teams in two groups, with the top two sides progressing to the quarter finals.

Al-Faisaly won their 19th title after beating Al-Jazeera.

Group stage

Group A

Group B

Knockouts

Bracket

Semi-finals

1st leg

2nd leg

Final

References

External links

Jordan FA Cup seasons
Jordan
2016–17 in Jordanian football